Grabionna  is a village in the administrative district of Gmina Miasteczko Krajeńskie, within Piła County, Greater Poland Voivodeship, in west-central Poland.

Notable residents
 Gerhard Stöck (1911–1985), German athlete

References

Grabionna